Guiliano is an Italian origin name which is used as a surname. People with the name include:

Surname 
 Edward Guiliano, American author and academic
 Mireille Guiliano (born 1946), French-American author

Fictional characters 
Salvatore Guiliano, main character in Mario Puzo's novel The Sicilian

See also
Giuliano

Italian-language surnames
Italian words and phrases